Mark Hennessy (born Mark Tom Hennessy) is the former singer for the band Paw, from Lawrence, Kansas. He was also the singer of King Rat, The Diamond Heart Club, 1950 D.A. (all from Lawrence too), and is currently the singer for Godzillionaire.

He is a self-proclaimed "poetry freak". In 2005, he released a book of poetry called Cue the Bedlam (More Desperate With Longing Than Want of Air), which was published in December 2005 by Unholy Day Press.

He completed a doctoral degree at the University of Kansas in Lawrence.

Music
Mark started singing in the Saint John's Choir, then created his own band, King Rat. Hennessy was lead vocalist and the main lyricist of the grunge band Paw. They recorded two major label releases, Dragline and Death To Traitors, and the EP Home Is a Strange Place. His voice was described in Kerrang! magazine as 'gargling glass'. In 2007, he sang in a seven-piece band called The Diamond Heart Club. The band split up a year later. They reformed under the name 1950 D.A. and split again. Currently Mark is playing in his new project, Godzillionaire.

References

1969 births
Living people
American male singers
Singers from Kansas
MNRK Music Group artists
People from Lawrence, Kansas
University of Kansas alumni
A&M Records artists